Paul Johnson is a guitarist and songwriter, best known for his work in instrumental surf music and the track "Mr. Moto" by his band The Bel-Airs.

External links
http://pjmoto.com/ Official site

https://www.allmusic.com/artist/paul-johnson-mn0000020790/biography
https://musicmoz.org/Bands_and_Artists/J/Johnson,_Paul/
https://musicbrainz.org/artist/ab3e5c8a-1097-4809-a021-6d3399f4e029

Guitarists from California
Surf musicians
Songwriters from California
American rock guitarists